Ali Al-Ameer (Arabic:علي الأمير) (born 21 February 1987) is an Emirati footballer.

External links

References

Emirati footballers
1987 births
Living people
Al Wahda FC players
Al-Wasl F.C. players
Al-Nasr SC (Dubai) players
Al Dhafra FC players
UAE Pro League players
Association football goalkeepers